Mitko Čavkov (born 24 January 1963) is a former Interior Minister of Macedonia. He was appointed minister after the mini cabinet reconstruction of the Macedonian Government by the Prime Minister Nikola Gruevski. On September the first 2016, in line with the Przino Agreement he resigned and was appointed Director of Bureau of Public Safety of Macedonia.

References

People from Strumica
1963 births
Living people
VMRO-DPMNE politicians